Dewayne L. Blackwell (September 17, 1936 – May 23, 2021) was an American songwriter active since the 1950s. His songs include "Mr. Blue", a 1959 hit for the Fleetwoods; "I'm Gonna Hire a Wino to Decorate Our Home", a 1982 hit for David Frizzell; and "Friends in Low Places", a 1990 hit for Garth Brooks. His songs have been recorded by the Everly Brothers, Roy Orbison and Bobby Vinton.

He also wrote songs for movie soundtracks.

Lived for a short time in Haines, Alaska.

Footnotes 

1936 births
2021 deaths
American male songwriters